Peter P. Gassner (born 1965) is the CEO and co-founder of Veeva, a company supporting processes in the pharmaceutical industry. With a net worth of US $5.25 billion, he is ranked 494th by Bloomberg on the list of billionaires worldwide. He is a member of the board of directors of Zoom Video Communications.

Early life
Gassner grew up in Portland, Oregon, the son of Swiss immigrants. His father owned a machine shop. Peter is the third of six children. When he was 8 years old, he worked as a paperboy. He later worked mowing lawns, in a restaurant, and then, in high school, he had a roofing business. In high school, he was also captain of the wrestling team. A math teacher recommended that he take a computer science class, which influenced his career.

Gassner kept starting and stopping college, taking extended breaks in Hawaii, Australia, and Thailand, where he worked as a trekking guide.

When he was 21 years old, he was robbed of all his belongings while hitchhiking through Malaysia.
He earned a degree in computer science from Oregon State University in 1989.

Career
Gassner worked on DB2 for IBM's Silicon Valley Lab. He also worked for IBM Research at the Almaden Research Center.

Beginning at the age of 30, he worked for PeopleSoft for 9 years as both Chief Architect and General Manager of PeopleTools.

He then worked for Salesforce.com as Senior Vice President of Technology.

After 4 years of working at Salesforce, he saw an opportunity to offer software focused on life sciences built on Salesforce's platform.

In 2007, along with Mitch Wallace, Doug Ostler, and Matt Wallach, he launched Veeva, a software firm that serves life sciences companies.

Personal life
Gassner is married and has 2 sons. He lives in Pleasanton, California. He speaks Thai language.

References

1965 births
American company founders
American billionaires
American chief executives
Businesspeople from Portland, Oregon
Living people
Oregon State University alumni
People from Pleasanton, California